This is a list of palaces and mansions in Borsod-Abaúj-Zemplén County in Hungary.

List of palaces and mansions in Borsod-Abaúj-Zemplén County

See also
 List of palaces and mansions in Hungary
 List of castles in Hungary

Literature
 Zsolt Virág : Magyar Kastélylexikon - Borsod-Abaúj-Zemplén megye kastélyai, 2006

References

Borsod-Abaúj-Zemplén County
Houses in Hungary